Howards End is a 1992 period romantic drama film directed by James Ivory, from a screenplay written by Ruth Prawer Jhabvala based on the 1910 novel of the same name by E. M. Forster. Marking Merchant Ivory Productions' third adaptation of a Forster novel (following 1985's A Room with a View, and 1987's Maurice), it was the first film to be released by Sony Pictures Classics. The film's narrative explores class relations in turn-of-the-20th-century Britain, through events in the lives of the Schlegel sisters.

Howards End premiered at the 1992 Cannes Film Festival, where it competed for the Palme d'Or and won the 45th Anniversary Award. The film was theatrically released on March 13, 1992 in the United States and on May 1, in the United Kingdom to critical acclaim and commercial success, grossing over $32 million on a $8 million budget. At the 65th Academy Awards, the film received a leading nine nominations including for the Best Picture, and won three; Best Actress (for Thompson), Best Screenplay Based on Material Previously Produced or Published and Best Art Direction. At the 46th British Academy Film Awards, it garnered a leading eleven nominations, winning two awards; Best Film, and Best Actress (for Thompson).

Plot
In Edwardian Britain, Helen Schlegel becomes engaged to Paul Wilcox during a moment of passion, while staying at the Wilcox family's country home, Howards End. The Schlegels are an intellectual family of Anglo-German bourgeoisie, while the Wilcoxes are conservative and wealthy, led by hard-headed businessman Henry. Helen and Paul quickly decide against the engagement, but she has already sent a telegram informing her sister Margaret, leading to an uproar when the sisters' Aunt Juley arrives and causes a scene.

Months later in London, when the Wilcoxes take a flat across the street from the Schlegels, Margaret resumes her acquaintance with Ruth, Henry's wife. Ruth is descended from English yeoman stock, and it is through her family that the Wilcoxes have come to own her beloved Howards End. The two women grow close as Mrs. Wilcox's health declines, and unbeknownst to Margaret, a dying Ruth bequeaths Howards End to her. However, the Wilcoxes refuse to believe Ruth would leave the house to a relative stranger, and burn her written bequest. Henry develops an attraction to Margaret, assisting her in finding a new home and eventually proposing marriage, which she accepts.

The Schlegels befriend Leonard Bast, a self-improving young clerk who lives with Jacky, a woman of dubious origins. The sisters pass along advice from Henry to the effect that the insurance company Leonard works for is heading for bankruptcy. Leonard quits, settling for a much lower-paying job which is eventually downsized altogether. Helen is later enraged to learn Henry's advice was wrong; Leonard's first employer was perfectly sound but will not reemploy him.

Months later, Henry and Margaret host the wedding of his daughter Evie at his Shropshire estate. Margaret is shocked when Helen arrives with an impoverished Leonard and Jacky. Considering Henry responsible for their plight, Helen demands his help, but Jacky drunkenly exposes Henry as a former lover from years ago. Henry is ashamed to be revealed as an adulterer, but Margaret forgives him and agrees to send the Basts away. Helen, upset with Margaret's decision to marry a man she loathes, leaves for Germany, but not before giving in to her attraction for Leonard and having sex while out boating. Fearing the Basts will be penniless, Helen instructs her brother Tibby to give them over £5000 of her own money, but Leonard returns the cheque uncashed out of pride.

Margaret and Henry marry, arranging to use Howards End as storage for Margaret's and her siblings' belongings. After months of hearing from Helen only through postcards, Margaret grows concerned, and Helen returns to England when Aunt Juley falls ill but avoids seeing her family. Believing Helen is mentally unstable, Margaret lures her to Howards End to collect her belongings, arriving herself with Henry and a doctor, and realizes Helen is pregnant. Insisting on returning to Germany to raise her baby alone, Helen asks to stay the night at Howards End but Henry refuses, leading to an argument with Margaret.

The next day, Leonard, still living unhappily in poverty with Jacky, travels to Howards End to visit the Schlegel sisters, arriving to find Helen, Margaret, and Henry's brutish eldest son, Charles. Realizing Leonard is the baby's father, Charles assaults him for "dishonoring" Helen and a bookcase collapses on Leonard, who dies of a heart attack. Margaret tells Henry that she is leaving him to help Helen raise her baby, and Henry breaks down, telling her the police inquest will charge Charles with manslaughter.

A year later, Paul, Evie, and Charles's wife, Dolly, gather at Howards End. Henry and Margaret are still together, living with Helen and her young son. Henry tells the others that upon his death, Margaret will inherit Howards End and leave it to her nephew, though Margaret wants none of Henry's money, which will be split among his children. She overhears Dolly point out the irony of Margaret inheriting the house, revealing Mrs. Wilcox's dying wish to leave it to her. Henry tells Margaret he did what he thought was right, but she says nothing.

Cast

Production

Financing

Merchant-Ivory encountered difficulty securing funding for Howards End, the budget of which stood at $8 million. This was considerably larger than that of Maurice and A Room with a View, which led to trouble in raising capital in the UK and the United States. Orion Pictures, the film's distributor, was on the verge of bankruptcy and only contributed a small amount to the overall budget. A solution presented itself when Merchant Ivory sought funding through an intermediary in Japan, where the previous Forster adaptations, particularly Maurice, had been very successful. Eventually Japanese companies including the Sumitomo Corporation, Japan Satellite Broadcasting, and the Imagica Corporation provided the bulk of the film's financing. The distribution problem would be solved when the heads of Orion Classics departed the company for Sony Pictures, creating the entirely new division of Sony Pictures Classics. Howards End was the first title distributed by this new division.

Casting

Anthony Hopkins accepted the part of Henry Wilcox after reading the script, passed to him by a young woman who was helping edit Slaves of New York and The Silence of the Lambs simultaneously in the same building. Phoebe Nicholls, Joely Richardson, Miranda Richardson, and Tilda Swinton were all considered for the part of Margaret Schlegel before Emma Thompson accepted the role. James Ivory was unaware of Emma Thompson before she was recommended to him by Simon Callow, who made a small cameo as the music lecturer in the concert scene. Jemma Redgrave (Evie Wilcox), who played the daughter of Vanessa Redgrave's character (Ruth Wilcox), is her niece off-screen. Samuel West, who played Leonard Bast, is the son of Prunella Scales, who played Aunt Juley.

According to James Ivory, although Vanessa Redgrave was his preferred choice for the role of Ruth Wilcox, her participation was uncertain until the last moment, because she was committed to other projects and it took some time to negotiate an acceptable salary. When she did agree to play the role of Mrs. Wilcox, she mistakenly believed she would be playing Margaret; only when she showed up on set to begin filming her scenes did the person in Hair and Makeup explain that she would be playing the elder Mrs. Wilcox.

Music
The score was composed by Richard Robbins, with elements of the score based on Percy Grainger's works "Bridal Lullaby" and "Mock Morris". The piano pieces were performed by the English concert pianist Martin Jones. Orchestral works were conducted by Harry Rabinowitz and performed by the English Chamber Orchestra.

 "Bridal Lullaby" by Percy Grainger Courtesy of Bardie Edition (used for the main title and Margaret's Arrival At Howards End)
 "Mock Morris" by Percy Grainger Courtesy of Schott & Co. (End Credits theme)
 5th Symphony by Ludwig van Beethoven (uncredited; featured in the lecture scene 'Music and Meaning')

Also of note is a Tango composed and performed by the Teddy Peiro Tango Quintet, and the music of Francis Poulenc, the Nocture #8. This theme is used while Ruth Wilcox walks at Howards End in the Evening Scene.

Filming locations

Filming locations in London included a house in Victoria Square, which stood in for the Schlegel home, Fortnum & Mason in Piccadilly, Simpson's-in-the-Strand restaurant, and St Pancras railway station. Areas around the Admiralty Arch and in front of the Royal Exchange in the City of London were dressed to film traffic scenes of 1910 London. The scene where Margaret and Helen stroll with Henry in the evening was filmed on Chiswick Mall in Chiswick, London. The bank where Leonard encounters Helen is the lobby of the Baltic Exchange, 30 St. Mary Axe, London. Soon after filming the building was bombed and destroyed by the IRA. The Rosewood London on High Holborn, which was then the Pearl Assurance Building, represented the Porphyrion Fire Insurance Company.

The quadrangle of the Founder's Building at Royal Holloway, University of London stood in for the hospital where Margaret visits Mrs. Wilcox. The "Howards End" house in the countryside is Peppard Cottage in Rotherfield Peppard, Oxfordshire. At the time it was owned by an antique silver dealer with whom production designer Luciana Arrighi was acquainted. The bluebell wood where Leonard strolls in his dream, as well as Dolly and Charles' house, were filmed nearby. Henry's country house, Honiton, was actually Brampton Bryan Hall in Herefordshire, near the Welsh border. Bewdley railway station on the historic Severn Valley Railway featured as Hilton station.

Release

Critical reception
The film received massive critical acclaim. On 5 June 2005, Roger Ebert included it on his list of "Great Movies". Leonard Maltin awarded the film 4 stars out of 4, and called the film "Extraordinarily good on every level." Dave Kehr of The Chicago Tribune gave a mixed review while reporting that the film "provides more than enough in the way of production values to keep its primary audience entertained. An audible gasp went up at a recent sneak preview over the film's re-creation of a Christmas-bedecked Harrod's of the turn of the century; the movie, like the store, knows how to put its merchandise on display."

Review aggregator Rotten Tomatoes reports that 94% of 65 reviews are positive for the film, and the average rating is 8.3/10. The site's critical consensus reads, "A superbly-mounted adaptation of E.M. Forster's tale of British class tension, with exceptional performances all round, Howards End ranks among the best of Merchant-Ivory's work." On Metacritic, the film holds a score of 89 out of 100, based on 10 reviews, indicating "universal acclaim". American audiences surveyed by CinemaScore gave the film a grade "B" on a scale of A+ to F.

In 2016, the film was selected for screening as part of the Cannes Classics section at the 2016 Cannes Film Festival, and was released theatrically after restoration on 26 August 2016.

Howards End was placed on more top ten lists than any other film in 1992, edging out The Player and Unforgiven. It was placed on 82 of the 106 film critics polled.

Box office
The film grossed $26.3 million in the United States and Canada. In the United Kingdom it grossed over £3.7 million ($5.5 million).

Home media

The Criterion Collection released Blu-ray and DVD versions of the film on 3 November 2009, which have since gone out of print. The release was unfortunately subject to a bronzing issue which would discolor the disc bronze and render it unplayable, due to a pressing issue at the factory, though not every disc was subject to bronzing. Cohen Film Collection released their own special edition Blu-ray on 6 December 2016. Although this edition was labelled as remastered in 4k, it is a 1080p Blu Ray disc. However in 2018, Concord Video released a 4K Ultra HD Region Free edition in Germany.

Awards and nominations

References

External links
 
 
Howards End: All Is Grace an essay by Kenneth Turan at the Criterion Collection

1992 films
1992 romantic drama films
1990s historical romance films
British romantic drama films
BAFTA winners (films)
Films based on British novels
British historical romance films
Romantic period films
Films about inheritances
Films directed by James Ivory
Best Film BAFTA Award winners
Films featuring a Best Actress Academy Award-winning performance
Films featuring a Best Drama Actress Golden Globe-winning performance
Films whose art director won the Best Art Direction Academy Award
Films whose writer won the Best Adapted Screenplay Academy Award
Merchant Ivory Productions films
Films with screenplays by Ruth Prawer Jhabvala
Films set in country houses
Films set in England
Films set in the 1900s
Films shot in Oxfordshire
Films shot in Worcestershire
E. M. Forster in performing arts
Sony Pictures Classics films
1990s English-language films
1990s British films

ja:ハワーズ・エンド#映画